The Motels and Martha Davis discography includes the following.

Albums

Studio albums

Compilation albums

Live albums

Soundtrack contributions

Singles

Other Martha Davis works

The Motels / Martha Davis videos

Awards
American Music Awards 1982: Best Performance for "Only the Lonely" at the 1982 American Music Awards.
Independent Music Awards 2012: Apocalypso – Best Re-Issue Album

References

Notes
 Rolling Stone – The Motels return with their "Version 2.0" – September 2, 1999
 Orange County Register – Entertainment section – July 16, 2005
 Personal writings from band members – Official website themotels.com
 Former band member Marty Jourard – Jourard.com
 Creem – Take the El out of Motels and it's Mots – February 1983
 Creem – The Motels: Martha Davis feeds her family – December 1980
 Los Angeles Times – The Motels: booked solid – April 29, 1979
 Orange County Weekly – No Vacancy – October 5, 2000

External links
 Official website
 Major website
 Biography from the VH1 website
 Booking Agency
  Interview with Martha Davis in Rocker Magazine 2011

Discographies of American artists
Rock music group discographies
New wave discographies